Brerewood  is a surname. Notable people with the surname include:

Robert Brerewood (1588–1654), English lawyer and politician
Thomas Brerewood ( 1670–1746)
Edward Brerewood ( 1565–1613), English scholar and antiquary
Francis Brerewood (1694–1781), English painter, translator, and architect